Presidential elections were held in Madagascar on 7 November. As no candidate received a majority of the vote, a second round involving the top two candidates, Andry Rajoelina and Marc Ravalomanana, was held on 19 December. On 27 December Rajoelina was announced as the winner with 56% of the vote.

Electoral system
The President of Madagascar is elected using the two-round system; if no candidate receives a majority of the vote in the first round, a run-off will be held.

Candidates
Former President Marc Ravalomanana, who resigned following a political crisis in 2009, announced that he would run again for the presidency. His successor, Andry Rajoelina, also announced his intention to contest the elections. Incumbent Hery Rajaonarimampianina unsuccessfully sought to block Ravaolmanana and Rajoelina from running on grounds that they had participated in the 2009 coup d'état. In September 2018, Rajaonarimampianina stepped down to run for reelection, allowing a caretaker government to administer the vote, in accordance with the constitution.

There were a record 36 candidates in the race (surpassing the previous record of 33), including four of the five most recent presidents. However, only five candidates were women, seen by some of illustrating the historic patriarchal dominance of Malagasy politics and culture.

Campaign

Despite the majority of Malagasy people living in poverty, the elections are expected to be one of the most expensive per capita in 2018. The top three candidates; Hery Rajaonarimampianina, Andry Rajoelina, and Marc Ravalomanana are at a significant financial advantage over the other contenders, with candidate Ny Rado Rafalimanana complaining that due to financial constraints it was impossible for any other candidate to compete with the top three, as there are no campaign finance limits. Some election observers believe that the winner of the election will have more to do with that candidate's financial power and influence than their political positions. The lavish spending on the election has also been criticized due to the large amount of poverty in the country, with many believing the money could be better spent elsewhere.

Although two-thirds of the population is under 25, turnout and interest among young people is low.

Results

References

Madagascar
Presidential elections in Madagascar
Presidential
Madagascar
Madagascar